Newbury Township is one of the sixteen townships of Geauga County, Ohio, United States. As of the 2020 census the population was 5,244, down from 5,537 at the 2010 census and 5,805 at the 2000 census.

Punderson State Park is located in Newbury Township.

Geography
Located in the central part of the county, it borders the following townships:
Munson Township - north
Claridon Township - northeast corner
Burton Township - east
Troy Township - southeast corner
Auburn Township - south
Bainbridge Township - southwest corner
Russell Township - west
Chester Township - northwest corner

No municipalities are located in Newbury Township.

Schools
Since 2020, Newbury Township has been part of the West Geauga High School after executing a territory transfer at the end of the 2019-20 academic year. Prior to that, Newbury High School was the last school in Geauga County to cover only one township -- prior to that, the only townships operating their own schools were Claridon, Troy, and Burton townships, who joined in 1968 to form Berkshire High School.

Name and History

The first known human inhabitants of the Township were the Seneca People, who lived in Newbury until they were forcibly removed to Indian Territory in Oklahoma in the 1830s. Newbury Township was part of the Connecticut Western Reserve until 1786, making it part of the State of Connecticut for a period of time.

The name "Newbury" likely came from a town in England or Newburyport, Massachusetts. It is the only Newbury Township statewide.

For a detailed history of the township, including its landmarks, see the Mini-History of Newbury

Government
The township is governed by a 3-member board of trustees, who are elected in November of odd-numbered years to a four-year term beginning on the following January 1. Two are elected in the year after the presidential election and one is elected in the year before it. There is also an elected township fiscal officer, who serves a four-year term beginning on April 1 of the year after the election, which is held in November of the year before the presidential election. Vacancies in the fiscal officership or on the board of trustees are filled by the remaining trustees.

References

External links
Township website
County website

Townships in Geauga County, Ohio
Populated places established in 1817
Townships in Ohio